Jan Nowakowski (born 17 May 1994) is a Polish professional volleyball player, a bronze medallist at the 2015 European League and named the Best Middle Blocker of the tournament. At the professional club level, he plays for LUK Lublin.

Personal life
He has a younger sister Pola (born 1996), who is also a volleyball player. On 25 December 2015, he became engaged to Martyna Grajber.

Career

National team
In 2012 played at CEV U21 European Championship 2012, where Polish junior team took 6th place. In 2015 he was appointed to team B of Polish national team led by Andrzej Kowal. Nowakowski took part in 1st edition of 2015 European Games. On August 14, 2015 he achieved first medal as national team player – bronze of European League. His national team won 3rd place match against Estonia (3–0). He also received individual award for Best Middle Blocker of the tournament.

Honours

Clubs
 National championships
 2018/2019  Polish Championship, with ONICO Warsaw

Universiade
 2019  Summer Universiade

Individual awards
 2015: European League – Best Middle Blocker

References

External links
 
 Player profile at PlusLiga.pl 
 Player profile at Volleybox.net

1994 births
Living people
Sportspeople from Bydgoszcz
Polish men's volleyball players
European Games competitors for Poland
Volleyball players at the 2015 European Games
Universiade medalists in volleyball
Universiade silver medalists for Poland
Medalists at the 2019 Summer Universiade
BKS Visła Bydgoszcz players
Projekt Warsaw players
GKS Katowice (volleyball) players
LKPS Lublin players
Middle blockers